Events from the year 1829 in Denmark.

Incumbents
 Monarch – Frederick VI
 Prime minister – Otto Joachim

Events
 7 June – C. F. Hansen's new Church of Our Lady in Copenhagen inaugurated after the previous building was destroyed in the British Bombardment of Copenhagen in 1807.

 19 June – Adam Oehlenschläger is publicly crowned with laurel by the Swedish poet Esaias Tegner in front of the high altar in Lund Cathedral, as the "Scandinavian King of Song.". The event cements his position as the leading proponent of Romanticism in the region and at the same time heralds the emergence the Scandinavismmovement.
 5 November – The College of Advanced Technology (DTU) is inaugurated with Hans Christian Ørsted, who had also been one of the driving forces behind its establishment, as its first principal.

Undated

Births
 29 January – Ludvig Lorenz, mathematician and physicist (died 1891)
 7 February – Theobald Stein, sculptor (died 1901)
 19 March – Carl Frederik Tietgen, financier, businessman (died 1901)
 30 November – Thomas Lange, novelist (died 1887)
 20 December – Hans Peter Hansen, xylographer (died 1899)

Deaths
 21 January – Kamma Rahbek, salonist and lady of letters (born 1775)
 18 February – Olfert Fischer, vice admiral (born 1747)
 4 March – Grímur Jónsson Thorkelin, scholar, archivist (born 1752)
 25 October – Andreas Birch, academic, bishop (born 1758)
 18 December – Christen Berg, politician (died 1891)

References

 
1820s in Denmark
Denmark
Years of the 19th century in Denmark